Lulu Town, also known as Lulu Ville, is a now uninhabited, former settlement on Navassa Island, claimed by both the United States and neighbouring Haiti, in the Windward Passage.

Overview 
Navassa Island was claimed for the United States on September 19, 1857, by Peter Duncan, an American sea captain, under the Guano Islands Act of August 18, 1856. The modest settlement was created to house both mine workers and supervisors whose goal was the rich deposits of guano found on Navassa. This resource, gathered mainly from the interior of the island, was stored in Lulu Town for later shipment to the United States.
 
Mining operations on Navassa Island were halted and the island evacuated in 1899 during the Spanish–American War. In 1901 the Navassa Phosphate Co. filed for bankruptcy and abandoned Lulu Town and rest of the island.

The town lies on Lulu Bay. Its ruggedness prevents boats from landing; such small boats as regularly ply the area are mainly fishing boats from nearby Haiti.

References

External links 
 CIA Factbook

Navassa Island
Former populated places in the Caribbean
Populated places established in the 1850s